The Presbyterian Church in Korea (HapDong) is an Evangelical Presbyterian denomination, which is the biggest Christian church in South Korea. The headquarters of the church is in Seoul, South Korea.

History 
In 1959 at the 44th General Assembly of the Presbyterian Church of Korea the denomination divided for the third time (1951, 1953, and 1959) into two equal parts due to the church's view of the issue of ecumenism and the World Council of Churches. The church was divided for and against Park Hyun-nyon, president of the Presbyterian Seminary Society of the General Assembly. The anti-Park party is called 'Tonghap' (the united body) and the pro-Park party is called 'Hapdong' (the union body).

The divisions from all three splits during the 50s still exist. The divisions from the third split between Tonghap and Hapdong respectively are still the largest Presbyterian dominations in South Korea.

The HapDong section represented more theologically conservative wing than the TongHap. The Tonghap group maintained its affiliation to the World Council of Churches and the National Council of Churches and allowed relatively wide range of theological positions.

The Presbyterian Church in Korea (HapDong) was the more conservative group in the schism. Its conservative doctrinal basis made it possible to unite later with the Presbyterian Church in Korea (Koshin) in 1960. But this union did not last and a group of Koshin churches separated a few years later, although about 150 Koshin congregations stayed with HapDong. In 1961, another group separated to form the Bible Presbyterian Church, later to be called the Presbyterian Church in Korea (Daeshin).

At the 64th General assembly in 1979 the church suffered another division. Kim Hee Bo the President of the ChongShin Seminary advocated for the historical-critical approach to the Pentateuch. The church divided into a mainline and non-mainline groups. The debate centered about two issues: the authorship of the Pentateuch and the relationship with the ChongShin Seminary. The non-mainline section fragmented in the following years.

In the 1990s the current HapDong experienced phenomenal growth. By the early 2000s, HapDong developed into the largest denomination in South Korea with more than 2.2 million communicant members, 5,123 congregations, and 6,300 ordained pastors. These figures differ from the statistics offered by Chongshin Seminary, which claims the church has 11,000 congregations and about 3 million members.

In South Korea there are about 15 million Protestants, about 9 million are Presbyterians in more than 100 denominations.

Doctrine 
The Presbyterian Church in Korea (HapDong) is a theologically conservative denomination. The Hapdong group subscribe the historic Presbyterian Confessions like:

Creeds 
Apostles' Creed

Confessions 
Westminster Confession of Faith
Westminster Larger Catechism
Westminster Shorter Catechism

According to the Apostle Paul's instructions, there are no women ordinations.

Theological Education 
The Chongshin University and Chongshin Seminary are the only official educational institutions of the HapDong Church to train pastors.

Missions 
The Presbyterian Church in Korea HapDong created the Global Missions Society (GMS) in South Korea for supporting evangelism and missions. The Global Mission Society, the missionary body of the Hapdong General Assembly of Presbyterian Churches of Korea, is the single largest Presbyterian missionary organization in South Korea and the world with over 2,500 missionaries working in Europe, Asia, Russia, Latin America, Africa.

References

External links
Official website 

Presbyterian denominations in South Korea
Christian organizations established in 1959
Evangelical denominations in Asia